Pseudaletis leonis, the West African fantasy, is a butterfly in the family Lycaenidae. It is found in Senegal, Guinea, Sierra Leone, Ivory Coast, Ghana, Togo and western Nigeria. The habitat consists of forests.

Adults are thought to be mimics of the day-flying moth Podomachla apicalis.

References

External links
Die Gross-Schmetterlinge der Erde 13: Die Afrikanischen Tagfalter. Plate XIII 66 g

Butterflies described in 1888
Pseudaletis
Butterflies of Africa
Taxa named by Otto Staudinger